Beklemishev, a Russian surname of Turkic origin (means "guard").

 Vladimir Beklemishev (disambiguation), a name of several Russian people
 Yury Krymov, a pen name of Yuriy Beklemishev
Lev Beklemishev, a mathematician affiliated with the Steklov Mathematical Institute of the Russian Academy of Sciences in Moscow

Russian-language surnames